The ICOM IC-705 is a multimode HF/VHF/UHF portable amateur radio transceiver. The radio has 5 watts of output when using its internal battery and 10 watts of output when using external power. With the rise in award programs such as Summits on the Air, and Parks on the Air this lightweight fully functional radio is a popular choice for people using them in the field. The IC-705 has support for a wide variety of commonly used amateur radio modes including ICOMs proprietary digital voice mode D-STAR. The IC-705 is also one of the first mainstream amateur radios to use SDR technology instead of the older superheterodyne design. Additionally the IC-705 has multiple extra features that are useful when operating in the field. Supporting the radio's D-STAR module is a GPS receiver to allow users to send their location though the D-STAR network as well as help locate nearby repeater systems. In addition to the GPS receiver the radio supports 2.4 GHz Wi-Fi which allows users to connect their computers or tablets to the IC-705 for running digital data modes such as PSK31, Winlink, and FT8. The radio has been praised for its size, easy to use menus, large easy to read screen and the quality of its build. Common criticisms of the radio include its lack of a built in antenna tuner and its price compared to other more powerful radios on the market.

Specifications 
Specifications of the ICOM IC-705:
 Frequency Range: Tx: 1.8 – 450 MHz (Amateur Bands Only) Rx: 30 kHz – 199.999 MHz and 400-470 MHz
 Modes of Emission: A1A (CW), A3E (AM), J3E (LSB, USB), F3E (FM)
 Impedance: BNC connector 50 Ohms, unbalanced
 Supply Voltage: 7.4 VDC Internal or 13.8 VDC External
 Current Consumption: 7.4 VDC Rx: 0.8 mA  Tx: 2.5 A  | 13.8 VDC Rx: 0.5 A Tx: 3 A
 Case Size (WxHxD): 200×83.5×82 mm; 7.9×3.3×3.2 in
 Weight (Approx.): 1.1 kg; 2.4 lb
 Output Power: 5W Internal Batty 10W External Power Source
 Transmitter Modulation
 SSB : Digital PSN modulation
 AM : Digital low power modulation
 FM : Digital phase modulation
 DV : GMSK digital phase modulation
 Receiver System
 0.030 to 24.999 MHz RF Direct Sampling
 25.000 MHz and above Down Conversion IF Sampling

External links 

 Official ICOM website
 ICOM IC-705 website

References 

Amateur radio transceivers